Hypogexenidae is a family of millipedes belonging to the order Polyxenida.

Genera:
 Hypogexenus Silvestri, 1903

References

Polyxenida